Parvipsitta is a parrot genus of in the family Psittaculidae. They are native to Australia. The group was previously placed in the genus Glossopsitta.

There are two species:

Mainly green plumage. The crown, lores and throat are red, the nape and shoulder bronze-coloured. The underparts yellow-tinged. The bill is black and the iris golden in colour
Dark purple crown. Yellow-orange forehead and ear-coverts, deepening to orange lores. Green upperparts, tinted bronze on the mantle and nape. Chin, chest and belly are powder blue. Yellowish-green under-tail coverts and thighs. Mostly green tail. Crimson patches are present under the wings in the male and not the female.

References

 
^
Taxonomy articles created by Polbot